Rage is an out-of-print collectible card game originally published by White Wolf in May 1995 based on the role-playing game Werewolf: The Apocalypse.  The game is based around packs of werewolves battling each other and various evil monsters while trying to save the world.

Product information

White Wolf
Rage had five sets of cards:
 Limited/Unlimited
 Umbra
 Wyrm
 War of the Amazon
 Legacy of the Tribes

The game was discontinued by White Wolf after Legacy of the Tribes. Three months later, Five Rings Publishing Group (FRPG) obtained a license from White Wolf to publish a new version.

The initial release consisted of over 300 cards sold in 60-card starter decks and 12-card booster packs.

The first expansion set was called Umbra, with its 90 cards sold in 12-card booster packs.

Five Rings
Freelance game designer Luke Peterschmidt, who had previously been lead designer at FRPG, was contracted to design a new version of the game for FRPG. It had the same card backs and set in the same world, but with completely different mechanics making it incompatible with the first version of the game. The second version of the game had seven card sets.  The first 6 were numbered and released once a month.  They were known as Phase 1 through 6.  The final set, Equinox, combined three of the smaller numbered sets (7-9) into one larger set.

Various producers
FRPG was bought out by Wizards of the Coast (the makers of Magic: The Gathering), who were in turn bought out by Hasbro.  Hasbro discontinued many of the games it had acquired in the take over, including Rage.  The license for the game lapsed back to White Wolf.

Azrael Productions, who produced an online magazine, acquired permission from White Wolf to provide tournament support for both versions of Rage.  However, Azrael was unable to acquire the license to bring Rage back into print.  While under Azrael's care, there were two notable developments. The first version of Rage came to be called "Rage: Apocalypse" and the second version "Rage: Tribal War" so people would not be confused as to which version people were talking about.

Azrael Productions also assembled a group of dedicated fans to start designing new cards for the game.   They started playtesting these cards before Azrael eventually abandoned the project.  Azrael gave up rights to the partially tested cards, leaving the path clear for the playtesters to produce fan-made sets of cards.

The first set of these fan made cards, Intermezzo, was released in 2003.  A total of five fan made sets for Rage: Apocalypse (Intermezzo, Periphery, Gauntlet, and Coda.  They are collectively known as the New England Block.  War Council is the fifth set and starts the Ahadi block.) and two for Tribal War (Web of Deceit and Christmas Present '04) have been released since then.  The cards are hosted on the official Rage site, River Von, but are considered legitimate by White Wolf and are allowed in regular tournaments and for use in online play.  They are not hosted on the main White Wolf server due to copyright issues with the artwork.

Online play
Rage was available for online play for several years via the gatlingEngine, produced by CCG Workshop. They had a licensing agreement with White Wolf allowing them to develop online versions of White Wolf's CCG properties (Rage, Vampire: the Eternal Struggle, and Arcadia: the Wyld Hunt). That platform is now defunct.

Due to complex legal issues, only Rage: Apocalypse is available for online play.  Hasbro retains some partial rights to Rage: Tribal War and was unwilling to license it to CCG Workshop.

While Rage is currently out of print, it can be played online using a program called LackeyCCG. Instructions on how to get started are at the Rage website. It runs on both PC and Mac and includes all printed cards, all fan sets and sets in playtesting.

Changes since online play began

A major rules overhaul for Rage's rules was released in March 2006.  The update clarified many card interactions and converted rulings about individual cards to global rulings. There was an additional update (Rage's Least Wanted) that errata'd the 18 most broken cards in the game and introduced new rules for Past Lives that returned them to play.

November 2006 saw the release of the first set in the Ahadi block, War Council.  This set introduced updates to the frenzy rules, Moot and Board Meeting rules, changed when the first combat hand was drawn, and allowed some Prey and Allies access to additional Gifts.  War Council also introduced a new Wyrm faction to the game, the Unbound, and made the 7th Generation part of a larger faction, Cults.  Additional Gaia and Wyrm factions will be introduced throughout the Ahadi block.

September 2007 has a flurry of Rage activity.  Rainmakers, the second set in the Ahadi block, was released.  It introduced the new Ajaba (werehyena) faction, fleshed out the Pentex Executives and Mokole, and introduced the first of the new Rogue characters.  The new Revised rules were introduced.  These were largely a reorganization of the old rules book, but also introduced a new timing system.  The long overdue rewrite to the rules for Battlefields was also released for Beta testing.

Hellcats (2011) introduced the Simba (werelions) and Bagheera (wereleopards) to Rage, as well as the eponymous Hellcats. This mixture of corrupted Caelican and fallen Simba was only briefly mentioned in Apocalypse and Rage expanded significantly on the source material. Curse of Set (2012) introduced a new subfaction of Cults, the vampiric Walid Set.

Call of the Sea is a four set block released in 2013 and 2014 with a semi-constructed deck format. It was also intended as a new introductory set for new or returning players which would make it easier to learn the game.  Three faction decks and one combat set were released for use in either regular or sealed deck format.  Chulorviah introduced a new Cults faction featuring mind controlling squid beasts. (Chulorviah originally appeared in World of Darkness: Blood Dimmed Tides source book). Rokea expanded the shark shapeshifters to a full playable faction.  Sea Dogs was a split deck with one captain each for Gaia and WYrm with most of the rest of the characters being Rogues, so would be either Gaia or Wyrm characters depending on which captain you selected for your ship.  The combat set works with any of the three decks, but had six cards for each deck that were specially marked as working best with that faction.

2014 also saw rerelease of Least Wanted with a second update to account for additional rules updates and the new sets that had been released in the previous 8 years.

2015 the 20th anniversary rules update was released along and a major overhaul of errata for previous sets was started. Conclave block entered playtesting and the first set of the Conclave block was released at the end of the year. Rise of Kupala expanded the Cults faction to include infernalists. A fan vote was held at end of the year to determine new members of the Silver Pack for the Conclave block.

The New England block was revised and remastered in higher quality in 2016.  Updated errata was released for most sets.  An update to how political actions (Moots & Board Meetings) was playtested along with the rest of Conclave block, which dealt heavily with political actions. An updated rules set for Battlefields was released.

To War! the second set in the Conclave block was released in 2017. War Council was updated to a higher resolution. The updated rules for Moots were officially released.

Sets/rules changes currently in production, as of Nov. 2017:
Something Old, Something New (Tribal War)- Abandoned due to legal issues.
Conclave (Apocalypse) - A four part block focusing on a grand moot- open beta for remaining two sets
Beast Courts (Apocalypse)- This is a block with multiple sets.  It deals with the Far East.  Initial design phase

Game sets and expansions
Apocalypse
 Rage Limited (1995)
 Rage Unlimited (1995)
 The Umbra (1995)
 The Wyrm (1995)
 The War of the Amazon (1996)
 Legacy of the Tribes (1996)
 Intermezzo (fan set- New England block 2003)
 Periphery (fan set- New England block 2004)
 Gauntlet (fan set- New England block 2004)
 Coda (fan set- New England block 2005)
 Rage's Least Wanted (virtual reprint/2nd edition- reprints of the 18 most broken cards with total redone wording to fix all mechanical problems- 2006)
 War Council (fan set- Ahadi block 2006)
 Rainmakers(fan set- Ahadi block 2007)
 Rainfall (fan set- Ahadi block 2008)
 Sahel (fan set- Ahadi block 2009)
 Hellcats (fan set- Ahadi block 2011)
 Ambush at the Apophis Pipeline (fan set- Ahadi block 2012)
 Curse of Set (fan set- Ahadi block 2012)
 Call of the Sea- combat set (fan set 2013)
 Chulorviah deck (fan set Call of the Sea block 2013)
 Rokea deck (fan set Call of the Sea block 2013)
 Sea Dogs deck (fan set Call of the Sea block 2014)
 Rise of Kupala (fan set Conclave block 2015)
 To War! (fan set Conclave block 2017)

Tribal War
 Rage across Las Vegas: Phase 1 (1998)
 Rage across Las Vegas: Phase 2 (1998)
 Rage across Las Vegas: Phase 3 (1998)
 Rage across Las Vegas: Phase 4 (1998)
 Rage across Las Vegas: Phase 5 (1998)
 Rage across Las Vegas: Phase 6 (1998)
 Rage across Las Vegas: Equinox (1999)
 Web of Deceit (fan set 2004)
 Christmas Present (fan set 2004)

Rage Limited
Rage Limited was a limited edition print run of the base set for the Rage CCG.  It contained 321 cards total, in common, uncommon, rare, and "chase" rarities.  The chase cards were available only in the Booster boxes.  All other cards were available both as boosters as starters.

Limited edition can be distinguished from Unlimited edition by the silver holograms in the lower right corner.  A few cards changed artwork between Limited and unlimited.  Some cards also changed text slightly, but most of these changes were relatively small.  A few cards changed card types.

Limited edition, despite the name, can still be easily found on eBay for prices below its original street value.

List of card artists
Apocalypse

 Barbara Armata
 Ash Arnett
 Andrew Bates
 Stuart P. Beel
 John Bridges
 Dennis Calero
 Hank Carlson
 Mike Carter
 Steve Carter aka 'SCAR'
 Richard Case  
 Mike Chaney  
 Mark Chiarello  
 John Cobb
 Michael Scott Cohen  
 James Daly  
 Mike Danza  
 Tony DiTerlizzi  
 Erin Dixon
 Robert "Shaggy" Dixon
 Mike Dringenburg  
 Brian "Chippy" Dugan  
 Jason Felix  
 Richard Kane Ferguson  
 Lee Fields 
 Scott Fischer
 Doug Alexander Gregory 
 Dærick Gröss Sr.
 Rebecca Guay
 Matt Haley  
 Scott Hampton  
 Tony Harris  
 Jeff Holt  
 Quinton Hoover 
 Brian Horton 
 Mark Jackson  
 Andrew Mitchell Kudelka 
 Clint Langley 
 Brian LeBlanc
 Paul Lee  
 Larry MacDougall
 Robert MacNeill  
 Anson Maddocks  
 John Matson
 Katie McCaskill  
 Chris McDonough  
 Ken Meyer Jr. 
 Mike Mignola 
 Matt Milberger 
 Aileen E. Miles
 Jeff Miracola 
 Christopher Moeller  
 Kevin Murphy  
 Jesper Myrfors 
 Ted Naifeh 
 William O'Connor 
 John E. Park 
 Shea Anton Pensa
 Omaha Perez  
 Alan Pollack  
 Michelle Prahler
 Steve Prescott  
 Jeff Rebner
 Adam Rex
 Kathleen Ryan  
 Antoinette Rydyr aka 'SCAR'
 John K. Schneider  
 Alex Sheikman  
 Tom Simmons 
 E. Allen Smith 
 Roger Smith 
 Lawrence Snelly
 John K. Snyder III  
 Ron Spencer  
 Ron States 
 James Stowe aka 'Sto' 
 Richard Thomas  
 Joshua Gabriel Timbrook 
 Jamie Tolagson  
 Drew Tucker  
 John Van Fleet
 Jos Weymer   
 Lawrence Allen Williams

Tribal War

 Shino Arihara
 Barbara Armata
 Andrew Bates
 Thomas Baxa
 Stuart P. Beel
 Blake Beasley
 Theodor Black
 Aaron Boyd
 John Bridges
 Ron Brown
 Dennis Calero
 Steve Carter aka 'SCAR'
 Steve Casper
 Mike Chaney
 Richard Clark
 John Cobb
 Joe Corroney
 James Daly
 Michael Danza
 Tony DiTerlizzi
 Jason Edmiston
 Veme Edwards
 Vincent Evans
 Jason Felix
 Richard Kane Ferguson
 Lee Fields
 Scott Fischer
 Jon Foster
 Tom Fowler
 Darren Fryendall
 Michael Gaydos
 Daniel Gelon
 Dærick Gröss Sr.
 Pia Guerra
 Matt Haley
 Fred Harper
 Henry Higgenbotham
 Anthony Highwater
 Anthony Hightower
 James Holt
 Jeff Holt
 Quinton Hoover
 Brian Horton
 Horley
 Sam Hubbell
 Jeremy Jarvis
 Kirby Kiser
 Patrick Kochakji
 Clint Langley 
 Brian LeBlanc
 Larry MacDonugall
 Corey Macourek
 Craig Maher
 John Matson
 Katie McCaskill
 R. Dean McCreary
 Chris McDonough
 Paul Mendoza
 Alfredo Mercado
 Matt Milberger
 Aileen Miles
 Ian Miller
 Jeff Miracola
 William O'Connor
 Shea Anton Pensa
 Omaha Perez
 Steve Prescott
 Jeff Rebner
 Andrew Ritchie
 Matt Roach
 Antoinette Rydyr aka 'SCAR'
 Alex Sheikman
 Tom Simmons
 Lawrence Snelly 
 Ron Spencer
 Ron States
 James Stowe aka 'Sto' 
 Richard Thomas
 Joshua Gabriel Timbrook
 Drew Tucker
 Anthony Waters
 Conan Venus
 Brain Wackwitz
 Lawrence Allen Williams

Fansets

 Andrea L. Adams
 Timothy Albee
 Kelly Bedson
 Ruth "Brushfire" Blais
 Matther Bradbury
 Simon D. Brewer
 Victoria Champion
 Denise Chan
 Christine "Mayshing" Chong
 Frances Cofill
 Tallulah Cunningham
 Cypherwolf
 Tallison D. Daemontruse
 Ferdz Decena
 Darby Dozier
 Alex Eckman-Lawn
 Eric Euler
 Juaina Ahmad Faszil
 Meghan Farrell
 Fabin Fernandez
 Feros
 Shelby Fetterman (Harliban)
 Josh Fontenot aka 'Maglot'
 Eric Garcia
 Roz Gibson
 Joshua Eli Gilley
 Ed Harris
 Christiee Hochstine
 Katie Hofgard
 Odis Holcomb aka 'Ryngs Rakune'
 Horationhellpop
 R. Hrynkiewicz
 Sam Hudson
 Markku Immonen
 David "Mutley" James
 Nathalie Jean-Bart
 Jidane
 Amanda "Hyena" Johnson
 Wes Jones
 Brienne "Ayanna" Jones
 Daria Kamiñska
 I.C. Kessler
 Caroline Kinsella
 Maja Krzyzanowska
 Mikko Lahti
 Lissanne Lake
 Emma Lazauski
 J.C. - KaTing Lang
 Andreas Larsson
 Therese Larsson
 Renee LeCompte
 Kimberly LeCrone
 Reagan Lodge
 Jordan Lorenz
 Stina Lovkvist aka 'Spocha'
 Katelyn Malmsten
 Ira Martin
 Mel Matthews
 Patrick McEvoy
 Jérome Merriaux
 Sarah Mezger
 Minstrar
 Cara Mitten
 Mutedfaith
 Dark Natasha
 R. Noke
 Northwolf
 Melissa O'Brien
 Lee O'Connor
 H. C. O'Neill aka 'Fenris Lorsrai'
 Wakka Ookami
 Cathey Osborne
 Star
 Otto Pessanha
 Yvonne M. Poslon
 Pseudomanitou
 Amy L. Rawson
 Gilda Rimessi
 Chella Reaves
 Allison Reed
 Revontulet
 Sitthideth
 Stephen Sloan
 Amber Smith-Cochrane
 Jess Stoncius
 Swiftrat
 Trevor Tang
 Kim Taylor
 Allison Theus
 Trantsiss
 Twisha
 Matthew Vega
 Traci Vermeesch
 Ursula Vernon
 Courtney "Hellcorpceo" Via
 Victory
 Jeff Waltersdorf
 Florence Wong
 Dani "Zippermouth" Zim
 Beth Zyglowicz

Reception
Andy Butcher reviewed The War of the Amazon expansion set for Rage for Arcane magazine, rating it an 8 out of 10 overall. Butcher comments that "The War Of The Amazon is another excellent expansion that offers a great deal for any dedicated player."

Reviews
Pyramid #16 (Nov./Dec., 1995)
Rollespilsmagasinet Fønix (Danish) (Issue 9 - August/September 1995)
Legacy of the Tribes expansion set in The Duelist #15 (February 1997)

References

Further reading

External links 
 Rainy Day Paperback Rage site 
Review in Shadis

Card games introduced in 1995
Collectible card games
Five Rings Publishing Group games
Werewolf: The Apocalypse
White Wolf Publishing games